The Stevensville Bank is a historic bank building located near the center of Stevensville, Maryland, United States, and is in the Stevensville Historic District. The building's name is a reference to Stevensville Savings Bank which once occupied the building. The classically detailed bank is now used as a law office.

It was listed on the National Register of Historic Places in 1985.

Stevensville Savings Bank
Stevensville Savings Bank was the bank that occupied the building until the 1960s.  At that time, the bank moved near a strip mall at the edge of Stevensville and changed its name to Tidewater Bank.  Tidewater Bank later merged with larger banks; in recent years it has been owned by Nations Bank and Bank of America.  The Tidewater Bank building continues to serve as a Bank of America branch known as the Tidewater Branch.

References

External links
, including photo dated 1978, at Maryland Historical Trust

Bank buildings on the National Register of Historic Places in Maryland
Buildings and structures in Queen Anne's County, Maryland
Commercial buildings completed in 1903
Kent Island, Maryland
Historic district contributing properties in Maryland
Individually listed contributing properties to historic districts on the National Register in Maryland
National Register of Historic Places in Queen Anne's County, Maryland